Sam Miller (born 12 February 1988) is an Australian cricketer. He played in three first-class matches for South Australia in 2012.

See also
 List of South Australian representative cricketers

References

External links
 

1988 births
Living people
Australian cricketers
South Australia cricketers
People from Ballarat